Music Concierge Music Concierge is a music consultancy firm that specializes in creating customized soundtracks for clients in the hotel, food and beverage, and retail industries.

Details
Launched in 2007 by a team of music industry professionals, ex-DJ and Jockey Slut editor Rob Wood, Music Concierge offers a range of services, including music curation, playlist creation, and audio branding. It is based in Hertfordshire and London. It also has representatives in other territories.

Clients
Music Concierge has worked with a wide range of clients across the hospitality and retail industries, including luxury hotel chains, high-end restaurants, and major retail brands. 

Music Concierge has designed bespoke music playlists for Dunhill, Claridge's and the Connaught Hotel.

When the Connaught Hotel’s Coburg Bar was refitted, Music Concierge was contracted to create a new audio identity.

Music Concierge supply the music to resort Huvafen Fushi in the Maldives. They also provide a music service to fashion company Mulberry.

References

External links
 
 https://www.wired.co.uk/magazine/archive/2012/10/how-to/how-to-use-music-in-a-branded-space
 http://www.luxurytravelmagazine.com/news-articles/music-concierge-tailors-music-to-the-worlds-finest-hotels-12480.php

British companies established in 2007
Companies based in East Hertfordshire District
Hotel and leisure companies of the United Kingdom